Qaralılar (known as İkinci İmamverdili until 1991) is a village and municipality in the Beylagan Rayon of Azerbaijan. It has a population of 870.

References

Populated places in Beylagan District